Valdar was the name of several legendary Danish kings. 

The Hervarar saga tells the tale of a Valdar who was viceroy of Denmark under Ivar Vidfamne and he was the father of Randver and of Harald Wartooth (half siblings and fathers found were Hrörek av Lejre and Radbart - mother being Aud Djupaudga) who was a legendary king of Denmark and Sweden.

The Skjöldunga saga and Hversu Noregr byggdist tell the tale of a Valdar who succeeded Hrólfr Kraki as King of Scania. This Valdar was the father of Harald the Old.

Hervarar saga
The Hervarar saga tells that Ivar Vidfamne made Valdar the viceroy of Denmark and gave him his daughter Alfhild. When Valdar died, his son Randver became the king of Denmark, while his son Harald Wartooth became the king of Götaland or Gotland. In the Hervarar saga, the name Valdar also appears in a poem together with other kings and nations:

Guðrúnarkviða II
Valdar is named as a king of the Danes in Guðrúnarkviða II (stanza 19):

Hversu Noregr byggdist
According to Hversu Noregr byggdist, a Valdar was the son of Roar (Hroðgar) of the house of Skjöldung (Scylding). This source makes Valdar the father of Harald the Old, the father of Halfdan the Valiant, the father of Ivar Vidfamne. If he is of the same origin as the Valdar of Hervarar saga, this account adds four generations (Harald the Old, Halfdan the Valiant, Ivar Vidfamne and effectively Ivar's daughter Alfhild/Auðr who was Harald Wartooth's mother according to all accounts) between Valdar and Harald Wartooth, who was Valdar's son according to the Hervarar saga.

Skjöldunga saga
The Skjöldunga saga tells that a Valdar disputed that Rörek, the cousin of Helgi (Halga) succeeded Hrólfr Kraki (Hroðulf) as the king of the Daner. After the war, Rörek took Zealand, while Valdar took Skåne. If based on the same tradition as Hversu Noregr byggdist, Valdar had the right to claim the throne being the son of the former king Hróarr (Hroðgar).

Heroes in Norse myths and legends
Scyldings